Colton Lott (born July 21, 1995) is a Canadian curler from Winnipeg Beach, Manitoba. He currently plays second for Team Matt Dunstone, and also curls with Kadriana Sahaidak in mixed doubles.

Career

Juniors
Lott's first curling success came with representing Manitoba at the 2011 Canada Winter Games, where he won a bronze medal, playing third for the team, which was skipped by Kyle Doering. This same team won the Manitoba Junior championship in 2012, and represented the province at the 2012 Canadian Junior Curling Championships. There, the team posted a 9-3 round robin record, won a tiebreaker, and then settled for the bronze medal, after losing to Northern Ontario in the semifinal. Lott won the 2013 Manitoba juniors playing third for Team Matt Dunstone. The rink would go on to win the 2013 Canadian Junior Curling Championships, and represented Canada at the 2013 World Junior Curling Championships. There, the team went 7-2 in the round robin, before losing both of their playoff matches. They rebounded in the bronze medal game, beating Sweden to pick up that medal. Lott was invited to play as Team Canada's alternate at the 2015 World Junior Curling Championships, on a team skipped by Braden Calvert. The team would take home the gold medal, but Lott would not play in any games. The Dunstone rink returned to the Canadian Juniors in 2016 after winning the 2016 Manitoba juniors. There, the team won their second Canadian Junior Championship, and would again represent Canada, this time at the 2016 World Juniors. The team again finished 7-2 in the round robin, lost their lone playoff game to Switzerland, but rebounded to win the bronze medal game against the same Swiss team.

Men's
While still a junior Lott played men's curling as well. He played for Team Jason Gunnlaugson at the 2015 Safeway Championship, his first men's provincial championship. At the 2016 Manitoba championship, he played with Dunstone, losing in the final to Mike McEwen. Had they won the event, they would've declined their berth into the Brier as it conflicted with the 2016 World Juniors. On the World Curling Tour, Team Dunstone won the 2015 Bernick's Miller Lite Open.

After juniors, Dunstone left the team and was replaced as skip by Gunnlaugson for the 2016-17 curling season. The team played in the 2017 Manitoba provincials, losing in the 3 vs. 4 game. The next season, Gunnlaugson was replaced by Pat Simmons as the team's skip. They played in the 2017 Canadian Olympic Pre-Trials, where they went 2-4. The team played in three Grand Slam events that season, making it to the quarterfinals of the 2017 Tour Challenge. At the 2018 Manitoba provincials, the team failed to make the playoffs. After the season, Simmons retired from competitive curling and was replaced as skip by Tanner Lott. With Tanner, the team won two Tour events, the Mother Club Fall Curling Classic and the KKP Classic.

Mixed doubles
Lott has found some success playing mixed doubles with partner Kadriana Sahaidak. The pair won the 2018 Manitoba Mixed Doubles championship and played in the 2018 Canadian Mixed Doubles Curling Championship, where they went all the way to the final before losing to Laura Crocker and Kirk Muyres. They represented Canada in the 2018–19 Curling World Cup third leg, winning the event against Norway's Kristin Skaslien and Thomas Ulsrud.

Personal life
Lott is a carpenter at Bygg Carpentry. He is married to his mixed doubles partner, Kadriana Sahaidak. His brother, Tanner Lott, is also a curler.

References

External links

Living people
1995 births
Canadian male curlers
Curlers from Manitoba
People from Gimli, Manitoba
Sportspeople from Selkirk, Manitoba